George and Georgette (French: Georges et Georgette) is a 1934 German comedy film directed by Roger Le Bon and Reinhold Schünzel and starring Julien Carette, Meg Lemonnier and Anton Walbrook. It is the French-language version of the film Victor and Victoria. A woman pretends to be a male female impersonator and enjoys great success on the stage, but has trouble concealing her secret when she falls in love.

Cast
 Julien Carette as Georges  
 Meg Lemonnier as Suzanne  
 Anton Walbrook as Robert 
 Jenny Burnay as Elinore 
 Paulette Dubost as Lilian 
 Félix Oudart as Pokerdass 
 Charles Redgie as Douglas

References

Bibliography

External links 
 

1934 films
German comedy films
1930s French-language films
1930s German films
1934 comedy films
1934 multilingual films
Films directed by Reinhold Schünzel
Films directed by Roger Le Bon
Films of Nazi Germany
German black-and-white films
German multilingual films
UFA GmbH films